Mangateretere is a rural community in the Hastings District and Hawke's Bay Region of New Zealand's North Island. The area is northeast of Hastings city and southwest of Clive.

The area was the Mangateretere Block in the 1860s.  of this constituted the Mangateretere West Block which the Native Lands Court granted to Māori owners (including Karaitiana Takamoana) in 1866, and most of which were subsequently leased to a local farmer. The Mangateretere East Block was a further . Ownership of the blocks passed to the local farmer about 1869 in what appears to be a transaction where not all parties gave informed consent. This was one of the transactions objected to by the Hawke's Bay Repudiation Movement of the 1870s. At least part of the land was returned to Māori in 1883.

Demographics

Mangateretere had a population of 1,149 at the 2018 New Zealand census, an increase of 96 people (9.1%) since the 2013 census, and an increase of 168 people (17.1%) since the 2006 census. There were 402 households, comprising 603 males and 543 females, giving a sex ratio of 1.11 males per female. The median age was 46.0 years (compared with 37.4 years nationally), with 204 people (17.8%) aged under 15 years, 192 (16.7%) aged 15 to 29, 558 (48.6%) aged 30 to 64, and 192 (16.7%) aged 65 or older.

Ethnicities were 91.1% European/Pākehā, 10.2% Māori, 2.3% Pacific peoples, 1.3% Asian, and 1.0% other ethnicities. People may identify with more than one ethnicity.

The percentage of people born overseas was 17.8, compared with 27.1% nationally.

Although some people chose not to answer the census's question about religious affiliation, 49.6% had no religion, 41.5% were Christian, 0.3% had Māori religious beliefs, 0.3% were Buddhist and 1.6% had other religions.

Of those at least 15 years old, 243 (25.7%) people had a bachelor's or higher degree, and 99 (10.5%) people had no formal qualifications. The median income was $35,700, compared with $31,800 nationally. 198 people (21.0%) earned over $70,000 compared to 17.2% nationally. The employment status of those at least 15 was that 492 (52.1%) people were employed full-time, 183 (19.4%) were part-time, and 12 (1.3%) were unemployed.

Education

References

Hastings District
Populated places in the Hawke's Bay Region